Josef Staudinger (2 November 1906 – April 1998) was an Austrian diver who competed in the 1928 Summer Olympics and in the 1932 Summer Olympics. He was born in Vienna and was the husband of Magdalena Epply. In 1928 he was eliminated in the first round of the 3 metre springboard event as well as of the 10 metre platform competition. Four years later he finished fourth in the 1932 10 metre platform event and ninth in the 1932 3 metre springboard contest.

References

1906 births
1998 deaths
Austrian male divers
Olympic divers of Austria
Divers at the 1928 Summer Olympics
Divers at the 1932 Summer Olympics